Salcano is a Turkish bicycle manufacturer based in Istanbul. It was founded 1975 in as a family company under the name Salko Bicycle.

The company produces a variety of bicycles including road bikes, mountain bikes, hybrid bikes, city bikes (aka utility bikes), and children bikes.

The company's 16,000 m² factory in Istanbul produces bicycles and also manufactures other parts such as wheels and tires; the company currently produces 225,000 parts annually.

In January 2021, the company broke ground on a new factory in Lüleburgaz, expanding its manufacturing area to 40,000 m² in total and expanding production capacity to 500,000 bicycles per year.

In 2011, the company sponsored a Union Cycliste Internationale (UCI) Mountain bike racing team known as ANKARAGUCU - SALCANO.

References

External links

Mountain bike manufacturers
Cycle manufacturers of Turkey
Manufacturing companies based in Istanbul